Puelche was a language formerly spoken by the Puelche people in the Pampas region of Argentina. The language is also known as Gününa Küne, Gennaken (Guenaken), Northern Tehuelche, Gününa Yajich, Ranquelche, and Pampa.

Classification 
Puelche has long been considered a language isolate. Based on very limited evidence, Viegas Barros (1992) suggests that Puelche might be closely related to the language of the Querandí, one of the Het peoples, and Viegas Barros (2005) that it is related to the Chon languages. Further afield, inclusion in a putative Macro-Jibaro family has been posited.

Phonology

Vowels 
Puelche has 7 vowels:

A short sounding // is realized as [].

Consonants 
Puelche has 25 consonants:

It is not clear if there is a uvular ejective stop .

Vocabulary
Loukotka (1968) lists the following basic vocabulary items for Gennaken.

{| class="wikitable sortable"
! gloss !! Gennaken
|-
| one || chéye
|-
| two || päch
|-
| ear || chütsk
|-
| tooth || xaye
|-
| hand || yapal
|-
| foot || yapgit
|-
| sun || apiúkük
|-
| moon || apioxok
|-
| dog || dáshü
|}

Bibliography

See also 
Boreal Pehuelche

References

External links 
 Gününa Küne language dictionary online from IDS (select simple or advanced browsing)
 WALS: Puelche
 Gününa Küne (Intercontinental Dictionary Series)

Languages of Argentina
Chonan languages
Extinct languages of South America
Languages extinct in the 1930s
Language isolates of South America